Osmond Charles Ardagh (1 November 1900 – 1 February 1954) was an English first-class cricketer who played a single match for Oxford University in 1922. He was born at Haslemere, Surrey and was found drowned in the river Thames at Wallingford, then in Berkshire.

Cricket career
In his single first-class cricket appearance, he opened the batting in the match against Leicestershire and scored just two runs. He also played a few matches for Surrey's second eleven in the Minor Counties in 1920 and 1922.

Personal life
In 1925, when his forthcoming marriage to Margot Irene Biheller was announced in The Times, he was credited as "of the Nyasaland Government Service". When she died in 1969, The Times recorded that they had had two sons, John and Hugh. His son John Ardagh was a noted journalist and writer on contemporary France.  His grandson Arjuna Ardagh is a writer, and the founder of Awakening Coaching.

References

English cricketers
Oxford University cricketers
1900 births
1954 deaths
Alumni of Merton College, Oxford
Deaths by drowning in the United Kingdom